TIROS, or Television InfraRed Observation Satellite, is a series of early weather satellites launched by the United States, beginning with TIROS-1 in 1960. TIROS was the first satellite that was capable of remote sensing of the Earth, enabling scientists to view the Earth from a new perspective: space. The program, promoted by Harry Wexler, proved the usefulness of satellite weather observation, at a time when military reconnaissance satellites were secretly in development or use. TIROS demonstrated at that time that "the key to genius is often simplicity". TIROS is an acronym of "Television InfraRed Observation Satellite" and is also the plural of "tiro" which means "a young soldier, a beginner".

Participants in the TIROS project included the National Aeronautics and Space Administration (NASA), United States Army Signal Research and Development Laboratory, Radio Corporation of America (RCA), the United States Weather Bureau Service, the United States Naval Photographic Interpretation Center (NPIC), the Environmental Science Services Administration (ESSA), and the National Oceanic and Atmospheric Administration (NOAA).

Description 

The  satellite was launched into a nearly circular low Earth orbit by a Thor-Able rocket. One of the cameras had a wide-angle lens with an  aperture that could view an 800-mile-wide area of the Earth. The other camera had a telephoto lens with an  aperture and 10- to 12-power magnification compared to the wide angle camera.

The satellite itself was stabilized in its orbit by spinning like a gyroscope. When it first separated from the rocket's third stage, it was spinning at about 136 revolutions per minute (rpm). To take unblurred photographs, a de-spin mechanism slowed the satellite down to 12 rpm after the orbit was achieved.

The camera shutters made possible the series of still pictures that were stored and transmitted back to earth via 2-watt FM transmitters as the satellite approached one of its ground command points. After transmission, the tape was erased or cleaned and readied for more recording.

Series 

TIROS continued as the more advanced TIROS Operational System (TOS), and eventually was succeeded by the Improved TIROS Operational System (ITOS) or TIROS-M, and then by the TIROS-N and Advanced TIROS-N series of satellites. NOAA-N Prime (NOAA-19) is the last in the TIROS series of NOAA satellites that observe Earth's weather and the environment.

The naming of the satellites can become confusing because some of them use the same name as the over-seeing organization, such as "ESSA" for TOS satellites overseen by the Environmental Science Services Administration (for example, ESSA-1) and "NOAA" (for example, NOAA-M) for later TIROS-series satellites overseen by the National Oceanic and Atmospheric Administration.
 
 TIROS-1 (A): launched on 1 April 1960, suffered electrical system failure on 15 June 1960
 TIROS-2 (B): launched on 23 November 1960, failed on 22 January 1961
 TIROS-3 (C): launched on 12 July 1961, deactivated on 28 February 1962
 TIROS-4 (D): launched on 8 February 1962, failed on 30 June 1962 (both cameras failed earlier)
 TIROS-5 (E): launched on 19 June 1962, failed on 13 May 1963
 TIROS-6 (F): launched on 18 September 1962, failed on 21 October 1963
 TIROS-7 (G): launched on 19 June 1963, deactivated on 3 June 1968
 TIROS-8 (H): launched on 23 December 1963, deactivated on 1 July 1967
 TIROS-9 (I): launched on 22 January 1965, failed on 15 February 1967. First Tiros satellite in near-polar orbit
 TIROS-10 (OT-1): launched on 2 July 1965, deactivated on 1 July 1967.

As of June 2009, all TIROS satellites launched between 1960 and 1965 (with the exception of TIROS-7) were still in orbit.

TIROS Operational System 
 ESSA-1 (OT-3)
 ESSA-2 (OT-2)
 ESSA-3 (TOS-A)
 ESSA-4 (TOS-B)
 ESSA-5 (TOS-C)
 ESSA-6 (TOS-D)
 ESSA-7 (TOS-E)
 ESSA-8 (TOS-F)
 ESSA-9 (TOS-G)

ITOS/TIROS-M 
 TIROS-M (ITOS-1): launched on 23 January 1970
 NOAA-1 (ITOS-A): launched on 11 December 1970
 ITOS-B launched on 21 October 1971, unusable orbit
 ITOS-C
 NOAA-2 (ITOS-D): launched on 15 October 1972
 ITOS-E launched on 16 July 1973, failed to orbit
 NOAA-3 (ITOS-F): launched on 6 November 1973
 NOAA-4 (ITOS-G): launched on 15 November 1974
 NOAA-5 (ITOS-H): launched 29 July 1976

TIROS-N 

 TIROS-N (Proto-flight): Launched 13 October 1978 into a 470-nmi orbit; deactivated on 27 February 1981.
 NOAA-6 (NOAA-A prior to launch): Launched 27 June 1979 into a 450-nmi orbit. The HIRS, a primary mission sensor, failed 19 September 1983. The satellite exceeded its two-year designed lifetime by almost six years when deactivated on 31 March 1987.
 NOAA-B: Launched 29 May 1980. It failed to achieve a usable orbit because of a booster engine anomaly.
 NOAA-7 (C): Launched 23 June 1981 into a 470-nmi orbit; deactivated June 1986.
 NOAA-12 (D): Launched 14 May 1991 into a 450-nmi AM orbit, out of sequence (see below). Placed in standby mode on 14 December 1998, when NOAA-15 became operational and deactivated on 10 August 2007, setting an extended lifetime record of over sixteen years.

Advanced TIROS-N 
The Advanced TIROS-N (ATN) spacecraft were similar to the NOAA-A through -D satellites, apart from an enlarged Equipment Support Module to allow integration of additional payloads. A change from the TIROS-N through NOAA-D spacecraft was that spare word locations in the low bit rate data system TIROS Information Processor (TIP) was used for special instruments such as the Earth Radiation Budget Satellite (ERBE) and SBUV/2. The search and rescue (SAR) system became independent, utilizing a special frequency for transmission of data to the ground.

 NOAA-8 (E): Launched 28 March 1983 into a  orbit, out of sequence (before NOAA-D) to get the first SAR system on a US satellite operational. Deactivated 29 December 1985, following a thermal runaway which destroyed a battery. 
 NOAA-9 (F): Launched 12 December 1984 into 470 nmi "afternoon" orbit and was the first satellite to carry an SBUV/2 instrument. It was deactivated on 1 August 1993 but was reactivated three weeks later, after the failure of NOAA-13. The SARR transmitter failed on 18 December 1997 and the satellite was permanently deactivated on 13 February 1998.
 NOAA-10 (G): Launched 17 September 1986 into a 450 nmi "morning" orbit. Placed in standby mode on 17 September 1991 (when NOAA-12 became operational) and deactivated on 30 August 2001.
 NOAA-11 (H): Launched 24 September 1988 into a 470 nmi PM orbit. Placed in standby mode in March 1995 and was reactivated in May 1997 to provide soundings after an HIRS anomaly on NOAA-12. Decommissioned 16 June 2004.
 NOAA-13 (I): Launched 9 August 1993 into a 470 nmi PM orbit; two weeks after launch the spacecraft suffered a catastrophic power system anomaly. Attempts to contact or command the spacecraft were unsuccessful.
 NOAA-14 (J): Launched 30 December 1994 into a 470 nmi PM orbit and decommissioned 23 May 2007 after more than twelve years of operation.
 NOAA-15 (K): Launched 13 May 1998 into a 450 nmi morning orbit and replaced NOAA-12 on 14 December 1998, as the primary AM spacecraft. Now secondary, with MetOp-B as the AM primary.
 NOAA-16 (L): Launched 21 September 2000 into a 470-nmi afternoon orbit; replaced NOAA-14 on 19 March 2001, as the primary AM spacecraft. Decommissioned on 9 June 2014 due to major spacecraft anomaly.
 NOAA-17 (M): Launched 24 June 2002 into a 450 nmi AM orbit and decommissioned 10 April 2013.
 NOAA-18 (N): Launched 20 May 2005 into a 470 nmi afternoon orbit and replaced NOAA-16 as the PM primary spacecraft on 30 August 2005.
 NOAA-19 (N Prime): Launched 6 February 2009 into a 470 nmi afternoon orbit and replaced NOAA-18 as the PM primary spacecraft on 2 June 2009.

References

External links 

 NASA page on TIROS
 NASA page on ESSA 
 NASA page on ITOS and NOAA 
 NASA page on TIROS-N 
 NASA Goddard POES Program - POES Home
 NOAA Office of Satellite Operations - POES
 TIROS-1 50th Anniversary & Resources on Satellite Meteorology
 NASA's YouTube video of TIROS-1